Sergei Aleksandrovich Butenko (born 2 December 1960) is a Russian professional football coach and a former player.

External links
 Profile at Rostov official site
 

1960 births
Living people
People from Rostov Oblast
Soviet footballers
Russian footballers
FC Zorya Luhansk players
FC Chernomorets Novorossiysk players
FC SKA Rostov-on-Don players
Russian football managers
FC Chernomorets Novorossiysk managers
Expatriate football managers in Uzbekistan
Pakhtakor Tashkent FK managers
FC Rostov managers
FC Baltika Kaliningrad managers
Russian Premier League managers
FC Volgar Astrakhan players
Association football midfielders
TP-47 managers
Sportspeople from Rostov Oblast